Jan Jelínek (8 April 1893 – 5 July 1974) was a Czech legionnaire and author of a book about legionnaires from the Boskovice region. He wrote about legionnaires in Russian, Italian, and French from 1931 to 1938.

Military career

On 10 August 1915, during the First World War, Jelínek was enlisted into the Austro-Hungarian 8th field regiment (Moravian). He joined the Czechoslovak Legions at Menzelinsk on 22 August 1917 after being captured by the Imperial Russian Army. He served in the 9th Czechoslovak Rifle Regiment Legion, 3rd troop, and stated that he had been in the 9th company of the 3rd regiment of Karel Havlicek. His legionary service ended on 2 August 1920 with the rank of private.

Writing career
After the war Jelínek moved to Boskovice, worked as a revenue clerk, and wrote for a newspaper. He also became a leading member of the Czechoslovak legionnaires' syndicate (ČsOL).

His The veterans from Czechoslovak Legions of the Region Boskovice describes the activity of the Czechoslovak Legions from Boskovice in Italy, France, and Russia. Nearly 14,300 people from the area served in the First World War, or approximately 17 percent of the 1914 population. Of these legionnaires, 1,824 were killed, 604 were injured, and 2,600 were captured. Jelínek researched the book by interviewing other former legionnaires, gaining insight into their lives after the war, their experience in the legions, and their motivations for joining.

Jelínek  made his last public appearance on 25 October 1968 during a celebration of Czechoslovakia's 50th anniversary.

References

1893 births
1974 deaths
People from Vyškov
Austro-Hungarian military personnel of World War I
World War I prisoners of war held by Russia
Czechoslovak prisoners of war
Czechoslovak Legion
Czechoslovak writers
Czechoslovak Legions in literature